Gitta Ráczkó (born 7 December 1975) is a Hungarian Paralympic swimmer who specialises in the breaststroke.

References

1975 births
Living people
Swimmers from Budapest
Paralympic swimmers of Hungary
Hungarian female breaststroke swimmers
Swimmers at the 1992 Summer Paralympics
Swimmers at the 1996 Summer Paralympics
Swimmers at the 2000 Summer Paralympics
Swimmers at the 2004 Summer Paralympics
Swimmers at the 2008 Summer Paralympics
Swimmers at the 2012 Summer Paralympics
Swimmers at the 2016 Summer Paralympics
Medalists at the 1996 Summer Paralympics
Medalists at the 2004 Summer Paralympics
Medalists at the 2008 Summer Paralympics
Paralympic medalists in swimming
Paralympic gold medalists for Hungary
Paralympic bronze medalists for Hungary
S7-classified Paralympic swimmers
20th-century Hungarian women
21st-century Hungarian women